Roland Gerhard Fryer Jr. (born June 4, 1977) is an American economist and professor at Harvard University. Following a difficult childhood, Fryer earned an athletic scholarship to the University of Texas at Arlington, but once there chose to concentrate instead on academics. Graduating cum laude in  years, he went on to receive a Ph.D. in economics from Pennsylvania State University in 2002 and completed postdoctoral work at the University of Chicago with Gary Becker. He joined the faculty of Harvard University and rapidly rose through the academic ranks; in 2007, at age 30, he became the second-youngest professor, and the youngest African-American, ever to be awarded tenure at Harvard. He has received numerous awards, including a MacArthur Fellowship in 2011 and the John Bates Clark Medal in 2015.

Fryer began his research career studying social image and segregation, and then moved toward empirical issues, particularly those concerning race and ethnicity. His work on the racial achievement gap in the US led to a stint as Chief Equality Officer for New York City under Mayor Michael Bloomberg, in which role Fryer implemented a pilot program rewarding low-income students with money for earning high test scores. In 2019, he published a controversial analysis arguing that Black and Hispanic Americans were no more likely than white Americans to be shot by police in a given interaction with police. 

In 2019, a series of investigations at Harvard determined that Fryer had engaged in "unwelcome conduct of a sexual nature" against at least five women, that he had fostered a hostile work environment in his lab, and also cited unspecified conduct violations regarding Fryer's grant spending and lab finances. As a result, Harvard suspended Fryer without pay for 2 years, closed his lab, and barred him from teaching or supervising students. In 2021, Harvard allowed Fryer to return to teaching and research, although he remained barred from supervising graduate students for at least another 2 years. Fryer apologized for the "insensitive and inappropriate comments that led to my suspension", saying that he "didn’t appreciate the inherent power dynamics in my interactions, which led me to act in ways that I now realize were deeply inappropriate for someone in my position."

Early life and education 
Fryer grew up in Lewisville, Texas, where he had moved with his abusive alcoholic father at the age of 4. Fryer's mother left when he was very young, and his father, who beat his son, was convicted of rape, effectively leaving Fryer to fend for himself. Fryer became a "full fledged gangster by his teens". 

Fryer attended Lewisville High School, where he starred in football and basketball. He earned an athletic scholarship from the University of Texas at Arlington. However, he never actually played for the Texas–Arlington Mavericks; instead he decided to embrace academics, joining the Honors College, whose dean helped find him an academic scholarship. He graduated in 1998 with a bachelor's degree magna cum laude in two-and-a-half years of study while working full time at a McDonalds drive-thru. 

Fryer then did doctoral study in economics at Pennsylvania State University, receiving a Ph.D. in 2002. He then did postdoctoral research at the University of Chicago with Nobel laureate economist Gary Becker. Fryer has collaborated with several other academics, including Steven Levitt, the University of Chicago economist and author of Freakonomics, Glenn Loury, a Brown University economist, and Edward Glaeser, an urban economist at Harvard.

Upon completing a three-year fellowship with the Harvard Society of Fellows at the end of the 2005–2006 academic year, Fryer joined Harvard's economics department as an assistant professor. In 2005, Fryer was also selected as one of the first Fletcher Foundation Fellows.

Academic career 

By 2005, Fryer was regarded as one of Black America's and Harvard's rising academic stars, in the aftermath of publishing numerous economics-related papers in prominent academic journals. 
In 2007, at age 30, he became the second youngest professor, and youngest African-American, to ever receive tenure at Harvard (Noam Elkies was 26). In 2007, New York City Mayor Michael Bloomberg appointed Professor Fryer to be the New York City Department of Education's Chief Equality Officer. Professor Fryer both inspired and oversaw the Opportunity NYC project, which studied how students in low-performing schools respond to financial incentives, offering as much as $500 for "doing well on standardized tests and showing up for class." In 2009, Fryer formed the Education Innovation Laboratory at Harvard University, and served as its Director until its closure ten years later, in 2019. In 2011, he was named a MacArthur Fellow and received the 2015 John Bates Clark Medal. Professor Fryer discusses his education work with Russ Roberts in an October 8th 2022 EconTalk podcast.

Fryer began his research career as an applied theorist, developing models of social image and measures of segregation. His research subsequently moved into empirical issues, especially those connected with race. In 2016, Fryer published a working paper concluding that although minorities (African Americans and Hispanics) are more likely to experience police use of force than whites, they were not more likely to be shot by police than whites in a given interaction with police. The paper generated considerable controversy and criticism. Fryer responded to some of these criticisms in an interview with The New York Times. In 2019, Fryer's paper was published in the Journal of Political Economy. Some scholars criticized Fryer's study, arguing that due to selection bias, he was unable to draw any conclusions about racial bias in shootings from police stops. If police are more likely to stop a black person than a white person, then the average white person that they stop might be dissimilar to the average black person (for example, the white person might be behaving in a more threatening manner), thus leading to faulty inferences about racial bias in shootings. Some of these potential differences (e.g. type of weapon held by the suspect, and whether they attacked the police officer), were accounted for in the analysis. A 2019 study by Princeton University political scientists disputed the findings by Fryer, saying that if police had a higher threshold for stopping whites, this might mean that the whites, Hispanics and blacks in Fryer's data are not similar. Nobel-laureate James Heckman and Steven Durlauf, both University of Chicago economists, published a response to the Fryer study, writing that the paper "does not establish credible evidence on the presence or absence of discrimination against African Americans in police shootings" due to issues with selection bias. Fryer responded by saying Durlauf and Heckman erroneously claim that his sample is "based on stops". Further, he states that the "vast majority of the data [...] is gleaned from 911 calls for service in which a civilian requests police presence."

Fryer is a research associate of the National Bureau of Economic Research, and a member of the NBER Economics of Education (EE) and Labor Studies (LS) programs.

Suspension from Harvard
In March 2018, Harvard barred Fryer from his research lab, the Education Innovation Laboratory (EdLabs), upon launching an investigation into Title IX complaints against him alleging sexual harassment. Fryer alleged that he was "unfairly scrutinized ... for his skin color." Harvard confirmed that its Office for Dispute Resolution received complaints against Fryer in January, March, and April 2018.

In December 2018, Fryer resigned from the executive committee of the American Economic Association, to which he had been elected (but on which he had not yet taken up his seat); Fryer submitted his  resignation after coming under pressure from fellow economists to step down due to the sexual harassment allegations against him. In a letter to The New York Times later that month, Fryer expressed regret for having "allowed, encouraged and participated" in a collegial atmosphere at EdLabs that included "off-color jokes" and comments about personal lives, but denied bullying, retaliating against employees, or making sexual advances to any employee.

Harvard's investigation concluded that Fryer had "engaged in unwanted sexual conduct toward several individuals" and "exhibited a pattern of behavior that failed to meet expectations of conduct within our community and was harmful to the well-being of its members." In July 2019, Fryer was suspended from the Harvard faculty for two years without pay, a disciplinary action determined by a panel of tenured faculty. Harvard also determined that, after returning from suspension, Fryer cannot be an adviser or supervisor, have access to graduate fellows, or teach graduate workshops, but can  teach graduate classes. Fryer had been one of Harvard's most highly paid professors. As the sanctions took effect, Harvard permanently closed EdLabs in September 2019.

Personal life 

Fryer is married to Franziska Michor, a professor of biology at Harvard. They met in 2006, as members of the Harvard Society of Fellows. He "...courted her by betting a dinner date on whether he could find evidence that smoking reduces cancer..." He has performed stand-up comedy at The Elbow Room, in West Hartford, Connecticut, inside of their basement comedy club "Stand-Up Underground."

Awards and honors 
In 2008 The Economist listed Fryer as one of the top eight young economists in the world.  In 2011, Fryer was a recipient of a MacArthur Fellowship, commonly referred to as a "Genius Grant". He is the recipient of the 2015 John Bates Clark Medal, awarded by the American Economic Association to "that American economist under the age of forty who is judged to have made the most significant contribution to economic thought and knowledge."

Selected works

References

External links 
 

1977 births
Living people
People from Daytona Beach, Florida
21st-century American economists
American social scientists
University of Texas at Arlington alumni
Pennsylvania State University alumni
Harvard University faculty
MacArthur Fellows
African-American economists
Fellows of the American Academy of Arts and Sciences
Economists from Florida
Fellows of the Econometric Society
21st-century African-American people
20th-century African-American people